Saitek is a designer and manufacturer of consumer electronics founded in 1979 by Swiss technologist Eric Winkler. They are best known for their PC gaming controllers, mice, keyboards, and their numerous analogue flight controllers such as joysticks, throttles, and rudder pedals.

Most Saitek products have been rebranded as Logitech G products since their acquisition by the company.

History 

Saitek (originally called SciSys until 1987) was founded in 1979 by Swiss technologist Eric Winkler as a manufacturer of electronic chess games. By the 1990s the company had distribution and design offices in the United States, Germany, France and the United Kingdom, as well as a factory in China. In 1994, Saitek acquired Hegner & Glaser's successful Mephisto line of chess computers. Saitek diversified into PC peripherals, focusing on game controllers for flight simulation, driving and first-person gaming.  Saitek has also expanded into PC peripherals, with an emphasis on input, connectivity and multimedia. In 2005, Saitek launched a high fidelity audio product line for PC & iPod.

On November 14, 2007, Mad Catz announced that they had purchased Saitek for $30 million.

On September 15, 2016, Logitech announced that they had purchased the Saitek brand and assets from Mad Catz for $13 million in cash.

Products

Pro Flight Controllers
Pro Flight Yoke System
Pro Flight Throttle Quadrant
TPM System

Pro Flight Panels
Pro Flight Backlit Information Panel
Pro Flight Multi Panel
Pro Flight Radio Panel
Pro Flight Switch Panel
Pro Flight Instrument Panel

Pro Flight Sticks

X-56 H.O.T.A.S. System (2018)
X-55 Rhino H.O.T.A.S. System (2014)
X-65F Flight Combat Control System (2008)
X52 Pro Flight Control System (2007)
X52 Flight Control System (2004)
X45 Digital Joystick and Throttle (2001)
X36 Flight Control System (1999), consisting of the X36F Control stick and X35T throttle

Flight Sticks
Aviator for PS3, Xbox 360 and PC
Cyborg F.L.Y.9 Wireless Flight Stick for Xbox 360/PS3
Cyborg F.L.Y 5 Flight Stick for PC
Cyborg 2000 Flight Stick for PC
Cyborg Evo Flight Stick for PC (2003)
ST290 Flight Stick for PC

Pro Flight Rudder Pedals
Pro Flight Rudder Pedals
Pro Flight Combat Rudder Pedals
Cessna Pro Flight Rudder Pedals

Accessories
Pro Flight Headset

Cessna Controllers
Pro Flight Cessna Yoke System
Pro Flight Cessna Trim Wheel
Pro Flight Cessna Rudder Pedals

Farming Equipment
Heavy Equipment Bundle for PC
Heavy Equipment Side Panel for PC

Keyboard
Saitek Cyborg programmable keyboard for PC

References

External links 
 Saitek

Chess computers
Electronics companies of Switzerland
Electronics companies established in 1979
Swiss companies established in 1979
Swiss brands